Agostinho Soares Nconco (born 27 January 1990), known simply as Nconco, is a Guinea-Bissauan professional footballer who plays for Portuguese club Vila Real as a left back .

References

External links

1990 births
Living people
Bissau-Guinean footballers
Association football defenders
Guinea-Bissau international footballers
2017 Africa Cup of Nations players
Bissau-Guinean expatriate footballers
Bissau-Guinean expatriate sportspeople in Mali
Bissau-Guinean expatriate sportspeople in Brazil
Bissau-Guinean expatriate sportspeople in Portugal
Expatriate footballers in Mali
Expatriate footballers in Brazil
Expatriate footballers in Portugal
Liga Portugal 2 players
S.C. Covilhã players
C.D. Cinfães players